Shakedown 2 is a compilation album by the Freemasons. It was released on 29 June 2009. The single "Heartbreak (Make Me A Dancer)" was released a week before, on 22 June 2009.

Track listing

Charts

References

2009 albums
Freemasons (band) albums
Sequel albums